The 2020 Mostar municipal elections were the direct elections for the 35 members of the Mostar Assembly and indirect elections for the 36th mayor of Mostar. It was part of the Bosnian municipal elections, although the elections in Mostar were held on December 20, 2020, while in the rest of the country the elections were held on November 15.

Background 
The first local elections after a twelve-year intermission were held in Mostar after the Constitutional Court of Bosnia and Herzegovina amended the election regulations relating to that city, and in the middle of the year a political agreement was reached with the mediation of international officials on the method of electing city councilors. Croatian Democratic Union of Bosnia and Herzegovina and the Party of Democratic Action have unsuccessfully negotiated new election rules for more than nine years, that is, how many councilors will be elected from which constituency. They agreed on this only in the middle of 2020, after strong pressure from the international community and after the judgment of the European Court of Human Rights from October 2019 following the lawsuit of Irma Baralija from Mostar. The European Court ruled that the fact that there were no elections in Mostar for so long represented a violation of the human and civil rights of the inhabitants of that city.

Mostar is one of the cities in Bosnia and Herzegovina known for its ethnic division. Since the end of the war in Bosnia, the city has been divided into a western part with a Croat majority and an eastern part with a Bosniak majority. According to the 2013 census, Croats make up 48.4% of the city, Bosniaks 44.1% and Serbs 4.1%.

Election system 
When electing councilors to the City Council of the City of Mostar, voters vote on two ballots. One is used to elect parties at the level of the entire city, and the other at the level of six city areas, in three of which Bosniaks make up the majority, and in three Croats. There are 35 councilors in the council, of which 13 are elected from the city constituency, and 22 are proportionally divided according to the number of voters in six city areas. Seats distributed by the Sainte-Laguë method for parties that have crossed the electoral threshold of 3%.

The mayor of Mostar is elected indirectly from the City Council. If in two rounds of voting none of the candidates receives two-thirds support from 35 councilors, a third round is organized in which a simple majority is sufficient. In case of a tie, the mayor will become a younger candidate.

City council elections

City areas 
The six city areas were divided in such a way that the city is divided into two parts, i.e. three cover majority Bosniak settlements and three majority Croats. The settlement of Mostar is divided into three parts, which belong to the city areas of Old City, West and Southwest. On the other hand North, Southeast and South includes rural parts on both riversides of Neretva.

North

Old City

Southeast

South

Southwest

West

City constituency

Combined results

Mayor election 
The city council was constituted on February 5, 2021, and the first round of elections for mayor was held there, in which none of the candidates received the required majority. Before voting in the second round, the representatives of the Coalition for Mostar, which includes the SDA, SBB, DF, SBIH and BPS, left the session, resulting in a lack of quorum, which is why the voting was postponed to February 10. After the first round, High Representative Valentin Inzko sent a message to the councilors that the election in the first round was invalid because the voting was held in public, which is contrary to the city's statute, which provides for secret voting. For this reason, on February 10, the first round of elections was repeated, which enabled new candidacies. In the end, Mario Kordić with 14 votes and Zlatko Guzin with 12 went to the second round, the other candidates were eliminated. The second round of elections was planned for February 12, but was postponed to February 15 at the request of several councilors. The second round was held on February 15, and even then no one got the required majority, 17 councilors voted for Kordić and 14 for Guzin. The third round was held immediately after that, and Kordić again won 17 votes, which was enough for him to be elected mayor, while Guzin won 16 votes.

Notes

References 

Mostar
2020 in Bosnia and Herzegovina